Josiah Martin (1843–1916) was a New Zealand teacher and photographer.

Martin was one of the founding members of the Grafton District School and remained headmaster there until 1874. In 1875, Martin helped to set up the Auckland Model Training School, which was the first of its kind in Auckland. He was also instrumental in founding the Auckland School Teachers Association in 1873 which aimed to create a national education program and fought for educational reform. After some health concerns, Martin turned his attentions to photography. In 1879, he traveled to London and was introduced to rapid 'instantaneous' photography at the Royal College of Chemistry. Once he returned to New Zealand, he opened a studio in Auckland. Martin became well known for his topographical and ethnological photographs. He often presented these at the Auckland Photographic Club.

In 1886, Martin was able to capture the eruption of Mt Tarawera on camera. These photographs were published in the Auckland Evening Star. Martin has also been published in the Auckland Weekly News, New Zealand Illustrated and exhibited photographs at the Pitt Rivers Museum at the University of Oxford. In 1886, he was part of the Colonial and Indian Exhibition and was awarded a gold medal in 1889 for his work in the Exposition Coloniale in Paris. Martin's photographs appeared in the French illustrated press through the photo-agency Chusseau-Flaviens.

Martin was an active lecturer, not only on photography matters but he also had an interest in geological and physiological subjects. He was editor of Sharlands New Zealand Photographer and a founding member of the Auckland Society of Arts. Martin served on the Auckland Institute Council from 1881 to 1892 and was the President of the Council in 1889. After his death in 1916, many of Martin's photographic collections were donated to the Auckland War Memorial Museum.

References

External links 
 Works of Martin are held in the collection of the Auckland War Memorial Museum Tāmaki Paenga Hira
 Josiah Martin in the collection of the Museum of New Zealand Te Papa Tongarewa

1843 births
1916 deaths
New Zealand academics
New Zealand photographers
English emigrants to New Zealand
19th-century New Zealand educators
Photographers from Auckland